Rubus gratus is a species of bramble found across much of Northwest Europe.

Description
Rubus gratus is an arching shrub, with a reddish purple, sharply angled stem. The stem has numerous prickles of varying sizes, most being between 4 and 7 mm in length. The leaves are composed of five yellowish green leaflets. Flowers are large (to 4cm in diameter), and pink.

Culinary use
Rubus gratus has been described as having some of the choicest fruits – the blackberries – among Rubus species, particularly for cooked desserts.

References

gratus
Flora of Europe